King George Hospital (shortly KGH) is a Government General Hospital located in Visakhapatnam, Andhra Pradesh, India. It is the largest and busiest government hospital in Andhra Pradesh. The hospital served the needs of north coastal Andhra Pradesh and adjacent Orissa for more than 150 years.
  Takes in about 1000 cases above O.P.D daily of people coming from even Orissa, Chhattisgarh.

History

It was started as civil dispensary in 1845 and upgraded into a 30 bedded hospital in 1857. The hospital's new building was inaugurated by Hon'ble Raja of Panagal, Chief Minister of Madras on 19 July 1923.

The hospital sees over 1250 outpatients everyday in various departments. Laboratory tests can be done inside the hospital. Turnaround time for laboratory test results is about three to four days. Average wait time to see a doctor is between one and two hours on a weekday.

In the year 2020,Dr P V Sudhakar,Principal,AMC College(AMC),unveiled a 380 crores modernisation plan for the college.

Affiliated hospitals

See also
 Visakha Institute of Medical Sciences

References

External links

 History
 Visakhapatnam Doctors

Hospital buildings completed in 1923
Hospital buildings completed in 1928
Hospital buildings completed in 1932
Hospital buildings completed in 1943
Hospitals in Visakhapatnam
1845 establishments in British India
20th-century architecture in India
19th-century architecture in India